Unplugged in Boston is a live album from American heavy metal band Megadeth, released on August 20, 2021 by Cleopatra Records. It features a live, acoustic show recorded at Bill's Bar in Boston, Massachusetts on May 9, 2001 by WAAF (107.3 FM) radio station. The album was originally exclusively released to Megafanclub members in 2006. It is the band's first acoustic album.

Release and reception 
Brave Words & Bloody Knuckles writer Nick Balazs gave the album a 6 out of 10, calling Mustaine "comfortable and confident behind the mic".

Track listing

Personnel 

 Dave Mustaine – lead vocals, guitars
 David Ellefson – bass, backing vocals
 Al Pitrelli - guitars
 Jimmy DeGrasso - drums

References 

Megadeth live albums
2021 albums
Cleopatra Records live albums